Lola Müthel (1919–2011) was a German stage, film and television actress. She was married to the singer Eric Helgar and following their divorce, to the actor Hans Caninenberg.

Selected filmography
 Police Report (1939)
 A Man with Principles? (1943)
 Hotel Adlon (1955)
 Roses in Autumn (1955)
 One Woman Is Not Enough? (1955)
 The Juvenile Judge (1960)
 From the Life of the Marionettes (1980)

References

Bibliography

External links

1919 births
2011 deaths
German film actresses
German stage actresses
German television actresses
Actors from Darmstadt